Change of Skin is the fourth studio album by English gothic rock band The Danse Society. It was released in 2011, through the band's own record label, Society. It was their first album since 1987.

Track listing

Critical reception 

After 25 years since their previous release The Danse Society "return with arguably their finest ever moment". New vocalist Maethelyiah replaces the missing Steve Rawlings, and Paul Nash fills in on bass as well as guitars. Terrorizer says "this still feels like a bold step forward, unfettered from the past". I Die You Die says "As a modern goth record, Change Of Skin is perfectly decent"  and Poponaut says "Stunning vocals as well as looks now complement the bands always original dark and powerful sound"

Personnel 

 Paul Gilmartin – drums, production
 Paul Nash – guitar, production
 Maethelyiah – vocals, production
 David Whitaker – keyboards, production

References

External links 

| The Danse Society official website
| Change of Skin at Discogs

The Danse Society albums